Patrick Fitzsimons may refer to:
 Patrick Fitzsimons (politician) (died 1982), Irish non-party politician
 Patrick Fitzsimons (bishop) (1695–1769), Irish Roman Catholic bishop

See also
 Pat Fitzsimons, American golfer
 Pat Fitzsimmons, Irish boxer